Robert Merl (born 5 June 1991) is an Austrian orienteering competitor and junior world champion.

He won a gold medal in the middle distance at the 2011 Junior World Orienteering Championships.

He competed at the 2012 World Orienteering Championships. In the sprint competition he qualified for the final, where he placed 21st.

References

External links

1991 births
Living people
Austrian orienteers
Male orienteers
Foot orienteers
World Games bronze medalists
Competitors at the 2013 World Games
Competitors at the 2017 World Games
World Games medalists in orienteering
Junior World Orienteering Championships medalists